I Love You But I've Chosen Darkness is a post-punk revival band from Austin, Texas. ILYBICD currently consists of singer Christian Goyer, guitarist Ernest Salaz, bassist Edward Robert and percussionist Tim White.

History
The band's eponymous debut five-song EP, released by Emperor Jones on November 18, 2003, was produced by Spoon frontman Britt Daniel.  

In 2006, the band released their first studio album, Fear Is on Our Side (Secretly Canadian), which was produced by former Ministry bassist/keyboardist Paul Barker.

After a sabbatical of eight years, ILYBICD announced on August 12, 2014, that their second album, Dust (also produced by Barker) would be released by Secretly Canadian on October 28, 2014, and previewed the track "Faust".

Discography

Studio albums
Fear Is on Our Side (2006, Secretly Canadian)
Dust (2014, Secretly Canadian/Monopsone)

Singles and EPs
I Love You But I've Chosen Darkness CD/12" (2003, Emperor Jones)
"According to Plan" 12" (2005, Artikal)
"You Are Dead To Me" (2014, Secretly Canadian/Monopsone)

References

External links
 I Love You But I've Chosen Darkness official website

Indie rock musical groups from Texas
Musical groups from Austin, Texas
Musical groups established in 2002
2002 establishments in Texas
Secretly Canadian artists